Elections to Chichester District Council in West Sussex, United Kingdom were held on 1 May 2003. The whole council was up for election and the Conservative Party held overall control.

Election result

|}

1 Independent candidate was unopposed.

Ward results

By-Election results
See Chichester local elections for by-election results after this election.

External links
 2003 Chichester District Council election result

2003
2003 English local elections
2000s in West Sussex